The Song of Glory is a 2020 Chinese television series. It is directed by Huang Bin and Li Huizhu, and stars Li Qin, Qin Hao, and Gu Jiacheng. It originally aired from 1 July to 28 August 2020 on streaming platform Tencent Video, and is based on the same source material as The Princess Weiyoung. It tells the story of the chivalrous woman Li Ge and the governor Liu Yikang who after many tribulations, get married, join forces to defend their country, and jointly create a prosperous and peaceful nation. On 22 November 2021, The Song of Glory won the International Emmy Award for Best Telenovela, becoming the first Chinese production to do so.

Synopsis 
During the Liu Song dynasty, powerful aristocrats have taken control of the government, throwing the country into chaos. To change this, Prince Peng Cheng, the son and regent of the late Emperor Wu of Song, Liu Yikang (Qin Hao) introduces new policies for political reform. To break the alliance between the aristocrats, Liu Yikang enters into a marriage alliance with the Shen family, who has roots in the military. Note that in actual Chinese history Emperor Wen, son of Emperor Wu, had the personal name of Liu Yilong and Prince Peng Cheng or Liu Yikang was his younger brother whom historically was a prime minister instead of the sovereign of a state. In this story, Prince Peng Cheng is named Liu Yikang and his fiancé turns out to be Shen Lige (Li Qin), whom he had previously met at a dance house. He is the younger brother to the current reigning Emperor Wen. Shen Lige actually took on the identity of her martial arts sister A Nu. A Nu was kidnapped as an infant from the Shen family. However, because Lige was wearing A Nu's bracelet, Mother Shen and the rest of the family come to believe she is their long lost daughter Jia. General Shen, Shen Lige's father, allowed her to officially enter the family as Shen Lige rather than Shen Jia. Her younger cousin, Shen Leqing becomes jealous because she loses her place as the eldest daughter. Shen Leqing creates many issues for Shen Lige, before, during, and after marriage to Liu Yikang. After marriage, Li Ge assists Liu Yikang in dealing with their political opponents and implementing new policies. However, in response, the aristocrats form an alliance to suppress Li Ge and the Shen family, who is later massacred. Pained by her loss, Li Ge vows to take revenge for her family.

Note that in actual Chinese history, during the Liu Song dynasty, Liu Yilong became Emperor Wen, and was married to Consort Shen, who later became Empress Dowager Xuan. The Song of Glory appears to partially emulate the life of Emperor Wen, also known as Liu Yilong, but instead uses the name of Liu Yikang.

Cast

Main 

 Li Qin as Shen Lige
 Qin Hao as Liu Yikang
 Gu Jiacheng as Liu Yixuan

Supporting 

 Qi Ji as Lu Yuan
 Zhang Yameng as Consort Fei
 Guan Xueying as Shen Leqing, Shen Lige's adopted sister
 Eddie Cheung as Shen Tingzhang, Shen Lige's father
 Deng Ying as Mrs. Shen, Shen Lige's mother
 Li He as Shen Zhi, Shen Lige's older brother
 Ren Yunjie as Shen Feng, Shen Lige's younger brother
 Long Zhengxuan as Wang Zijin, Shen Zhi's lover
 Cai Yida as Chen Shaoxun
 Tan Jianchang as Xu Lin
 Lu Zhanxiang as Kong Cheng
 Wang Cha as Wang Mian
 Li Guangfu as Cui Taifu
 Li Jianyi as Mrs. Xie
 Li Taiyan as Xie Hao
 Du Yuchen as Xie Yunzhi
 Chen Lianping as Lu Yandi
 Tian Xiwei as Lu Wan
 Gao Guangze as Xue Dai
 Cheng Shuonan as San Bao
 Yang Zhen as Xu Zhan
 Liu Hanyang as Ji Shu
 Hu Bo as Huo Yun
 Liu Shu as Fang Qing
 Guan Yue as Xiao Xin
 Li Zhao as A Nu
 Wang Xiao as A Ling
 Li Jiayao as Ling Xi
 Tu Liman as Chun Fang
 Furou Meiqi as Hong Dan
 Zhang Xinyue as Yu Yan
 Qian Qianyi as Yu Chan
 Wen Zhu as Mei Qi
 Wei Yibo as Ting Wei
 Du Ziming as Wan Jingsheng
 Chen Qianduo as Yue Mei

Production

Development 
The series is produced by the same producers and headed by the same crew behind The Princess Weiyoung. It's based on the second part of the novel The Poisonous Daughter (Chinese: 庶女有毒) by Qin Jian, the same source material of The Princess Weiyoung.

Filming 
On March 15, 2019, the production crew started principal photography. Wen Weiji and Wang Deming acted as martial arts directors. Shen Zhi, Shen Tingzhang and Shen Mu, together with Song Zhiyan and Yuan Bin, senior group special administrators of Hengdian Actors Guild, organized more than 200 Hengdian actors/extras to film. The series finished filming in Hengdian Studios on July 27, 2019, and entered post-production.

Original soundtrack 

Hong Kong

Reception

Critical response 
Upon its release, The Song of Glory has received mixed reviews. On an article published by Sohu, the plot was described as "weak" and "cliché", although the performances of the lead actors were described as "unflawed". Some scenes were described as "nonsensical". The female lead was described as lacking character development, making her hard to empathize with. The article concludes by saying that "the series failed to show the process of how the outcomes are achieved", adding that "there is no logical reasoning behind emotions to support viewers’ understanding" of the characters.

A review published by Soompi, on the other hand, was more favourable. It described the plot as "captivating", and "with a dreamy love story", while also praising the series' "gorgeous production values". The review also complimented the series for its costumes, which are "memorable without crossing into ostentatious", and its sets, which have a "very distinctive decor and atmosphere". The fighting scenes and several points of the plot, such as female friendship, and family dynamics were also singled out for praise.

Ratings 
The combined weekly ratings of The Song of Glory on TVB channels Jade and myTV SUPER is the following:

 Highest ratings are marked in red, lowest ratings are marked in blue.

Awards and nominations

International broadcast

References

External links 
 
 The Song of Glory on Sina Weibo
 The Song of Glory on Douban

Chinese historical television series
2020 Chinese television series debuts
Chinese romance television series
Tencent original programming
IQIYI original programming
Television series by Croton Media
Television series set in the Northern and Southern dynasties